Krupin  is a village in the administrative district of Gmina Prostki, within Ełk County, Warmian-Masurian Voivodeship, in north-eastern Poland. It is located in the historic region of Masuria.

Since its establishment, Krupin was an ethnically Polish village. It surely existed by 1553. Various Polish nobility lived there, including the Ciesielski, Wilkowski and Dulski families.

References

Villages in Ełk County